The Supreme Military Council was the body that ruled Nigeria after the 1966 coup d'état until it was dissolved following the 1979 parliamentary election and the Second Nigerian Republic. The Supreme Military Council was located at Dodan Barracks as the Supreme Military Headquartered (SMHQ) in Lagos.

According to a Constitutional Decree, published in Lagos on 17 March 1967, legislative and executive power was vested in the Supreme Military Council. The chairman of the council was the head of the Military Government.

The Supreme Military Council consisted of the Regional Military Governors and the Military Administrator of the Federal Territory, the Heads of the Nigerian Army, Navy and Air Force, the Chief of Staff of the Armed Forces and the Inspector-General of Police or his Deputy.

The Supreme Military Council could delegate powers to a Federal Executive Council, predominantly composed of civilian Commissioners.

The initial President of the Supreme Military Council was Maj.-Gen. Yakubu Gowon, Commander-in-Chief of the Nigerian Armed Forces. He was replaced by Murtala Muhammed (in 1975) and Olusegun Obasanjo (in 1976) in successive coups.

Following the 1983 coup d'état, Muhammadu Buhari created another Supreme Military Council that lasted until the 1985 coup d'état.

Members

The Military Governors of the twelve states of the federation were ex-officio members of the committee.

Sources
The Europa World Year Book 1970

Politics of Nigeria
1960s in Nigeria
1970s in Nigeria
1966 establishments in Nigeria
1979 disestablishments in Africa